The 2021 Tennessee Tech Golden Eagles football team represented Tennessee Technological University as a member of the Ohio Valley Conference (OVC) during the 2021 NCAA Division I FCS football season. Led by fourth-year head coach Dewayne Alexander, the Golden Eagles compiled an overall record of 3–8 with a mark of 1–5 in conference play, tying for sixth place in the OVC. Tech Golden played home games at Tucker Stadium in Cookeville, Tennessee.

Schedule

References

Tennessee Tech
Tennessee Tech Golden Eagles football seasons
Tennessee Tech Golden Eagles football